Niobia is a monotypic genus of cnidarians belonging to the monotypic family Niobiidae. The only species is Niobia dendrotentaculata.

The species is found in Northern America.

References

Filifera